Tosk is the southern group of dialects of the Albanian language, spoken by the ethnographic group known as Tosks. The line of demarcation between Tosk and Gheg (the northern variety) is the Shkumbin River. Tosk is the basis of the standard Albanian language.

Major Tosk-speaking groups include the Myzeqars of Myzeqe, Labs of Labëria, Chams of Çamëria, Arvanites of Greece and the Arbëreshë of Italy, as well as  the original inhabitants of Mandritsa in Bulgaria. In North Macedonia, there were approximately 3000 speakers in the early 1980s.

Tosk features

 Rhotacism: Proto-Albanian *-n- becomes -r- (e.g. rëra "sand")
 Tosk dialects preserve groups mb, ngj and nd assimilated to m, nj and n in  Geg.
 Proto-Albanian *ō becomes va.
 Nasal vowels: There is a lack of nasal vowels in Tosk (e.g. sy "eye") and Late Proto-Albanian *â plus a nasal becomes ë (e.g. nëntë "nine").
 e-vowel: The e becomes ë in some varieties in some words qën for qen in Vjosë.
 ë-vowel: The ë may have several pronunciations depending on dialect: the ë is more backed in Labërisht dialects like that of Vuno, where mëz "foal" is ).  Final -ë drops in many Tosk dialects and lengthens the preceding vowel.
 y-vowel: The y vowel often derounds to i in Labërisht, Çam, Arvanitika and Arbëresh (e.g. dy "two" becomes di).
 Dh and Ll: These sounds may interchange in some words in some varieties.
 H: This may drop in any position in some dialects.
 Gl/Kl: Some varieties of Çam, Arberësh, and Arvanitika retain kl and gl in place of q and gj (e.g. gjuhë "tongue" is gluhë in Çam, gluhë in Siculo-Arberësh, and  gljuhë in Arvanitika; "klumësh" for "qumësht" "milk" in Arbëresh).
 Rr: Rr becomes r in some varieties.

Northern Tosk

Vowels 

See also 
Albanian dialects
Lab Albanian dialect
Cham Albanian dialect
Arvanitika
Arbëresh language

References

External links

ISO documentation

Albanian dialects